Wendy Wassyng Roworth is professor emerita of art history at the University of Rhode Island. Roworth is a specialist in eighteenth century British and Italian art and the art of Angelica Kauffman.

Roworth curated the exhibition "Angelica Kauffman: A continental artist in Georgian England" which was held at the Royal Pavilion Art Gallery & Museums, Brighton in 1992 and also in York. She edited the accompanying book.

Roworth has held fellowships with the National Endowment for the Humanities and was a scholar in residence at the National Museum for Women in the Arts in Washington D.C.

Selected publications
Angelica Kauffman: A continental Artist in Georgian England. Reaktion Books, London, 1992. (Editor) 
"Anatomy is destiny: Regarding the body in the art of Angelica Kauffman", in Femininity and masculinity in eighteenth-century art and culture. Edited by Gillian Perry & Michael Rossington. Manchester University Press, Manchester, 1994. 
"Painting for profit and pleasure: Angelica Kauffman and the art business in Rome", Eighteenth-Century Studies, Volume 29, Number 2, Winter 1995–96. pp. 225–228.
"Documenting Angelica Kauffman's life and art", Eighteenth-Century Studies, Volume 37, Number 3, Spring 2004, pp. 478–482.
"Pulling Parrhasius's curtain: Trickery and fakery in the Roman art world" in Richard Wrigley (ed.) Regarding romantic Rome, Peter Lang, 2007.
Italy's Eighteenth Century: Gender and culture in the age of the Grand Tour. Stanford University Press, Stanford, 2009. (Edited by Paula Findlen and Catherine M. Sama)

See also
Angela Rosenthal
Bettina Baumgärtel

References 

Living people
Year of birth missing (living people)
University of Rhode Island faculty
American art historians
Women art historians
Angelica Kauffman